This is a partial list of allegations of misuse of the United States Internal Revenue Service (IRS), which traces its roots to the creation of the Commissioner of Internal Revenue in 1862. Examples of political profiling controversies include cases in which IRS employees or government officials have allegedly used IRS resources to target individuals and groups for espousing or expressing particular political beliefs.

1930s 

Use of the IRS for political targeting has been alleged as far back as the Franklin D. Roosevelt administration. To discredit political opponent Huey Long and damage his support base, Roosevelt had Long's finances investigated by the Internal Revenue Service in 1934.

"My father," Elliott Roosevelt observed of his famous parent, "may have been the originator of the concept of employing the IRS as a weapon of political retribution."

1940s–1960s 

The most famous Kennedy administration project allegedly deploying tax-related targeting was called the "Ideological Organizations Project".  This was a project which allegedly investigated, intimidated, and challenged the tax-exempt status of right-wing foundations.

Many instances of alleged political profiling were coordinated with the Federal Bureau of Investigation (FBI), sometimes under COINTELPRO.  The IRS provided the FBI with free access to tax returns, which the FBI used to investigate groups as ideologically varied as the John Birch Society, the National Association for the Advancement of Colored People, and the American Communist Party.

Beginning in the 1950s and continuing into the 1960s, the IRS audited civil rights leader Martin Luther King Jr. numerous times.  In addition to King himself, the Southern Christian Leadership Conference and several of King's lawyers were subjected to audits.

Nixon

In 1974, a Bill of Impeachment against President Richard Nixon was approved by the House Judiciary Committee that included charges that his administration attempted to use the IRS in a discriminatory manner:

RESOLVED, That Richard M. Nixon, President of the United States, is impeached for high crimes and misdemeanours...

Using the powers of the office of President of the United States, Richard M. Nixon, in violation of his constitutional oath faithfully to execute the office of President of the United States...

He has, acting personally and through his subordinates and agents, endeavoured to... cause, in violation of the constitutional rights of citizens, income tax audits or other income tax investigations to be initiated or conducted in a discriminatory manner.

Clinton 
Conservative groups including the Heritage Foundation, the National Rifle Association, and Judicial Watch alleged that the Clinton administration subjected them to politically motivated audits.

G. W. Bush 

The NAACP was audited in 2004 after its chairman criticized then-President George W. Bush for failing to address the group, becoming the first president to do so since Herbert Hoover.  The IRS informed the NAACP that the audit was prompted by then-NAACP-chairman Julian Bond's speech, which "condemned the administration policies of George W. Bush on education, the economy and the war in Iraq."  Although the IRS maintained that the audit was an attempt to determine whether the NAACP had involved itself in a political campaign, the NAACP and Democratic Party representatives characterized the audit as an attempt to stifle criticism of Bush, intimidate NAACP members, and harm the NAACP's get-out-the-vote campaign.

According to the Huffington Post in 2004, the Wall Street Journal reported that the IRS audited the liberal group Greenpeace at the request of Public Interest Watch, a group funded by Exxon-Mobil. Exxon-Mobil said it was not aware of the IRS audit, nor did it have a role in initiating the audit.

According to the Tampa Bay Times PolitiFact the allegation that the IRS during the Bush Administration targeted liberal groups is "Mostly False".

Obama 

In May 2013, the IRS admitted it had subjected conservative political groups to closer scrutiny in their applications for tax-exempt status based on particular keywords in their names.  The agency has maintained that low-level employees took it upon themselves to do this.  However, Republicans argue that the refusal of Lois Lerner (at the time was Director of the IRS's Exempt Organizations Unit) to testify before Congress, twice citing her Constitutional right against self-incrimination, suggests involvement by higher-level employees.  An internal report by the agency's Inspector General cited "ineffective management" as the cause and indicated that the IRS "will need to do more so that the public has reasonable assurance that applications are processed without unreasonable delay in a fair and impartial manner in the future."  Congress continues to investigate the possibility that Lerner or other high-level officials were involved in improper political targeting. Republican lawmakers say the IRS has improperly withheld and destroyed evidence, while Democrats argue that Republicans are attempting to keep the controversy alive for political purposes.

Trump
President Donald Trump may have illegally targeted political enemies James Comey and Andrew McCabe with IRS audits.

References 

Political scandals in the United States
2010 in the United States
2011 in the United States
2012 in the United States
2013 in the United States
2013 scandals
Internal Revenue Service